The Procaer Cobra was a two-seat turbojet powered light aircraft designed and built in Italy and flown in the early 1960s.  Only one was completed.

Design and development

The Cobra was a cantilever low wing monoplane with a wooden structure covered in plywood, which had an outer thin aluminium skin bonded to it.  The single spar wings had a maximum thickness to chord ratio of 16.5%; in plan they were unswept and straight tapered.  There was 6° of dihedral.  The ailerons were fitted with electrically operated trim tabs and the inboard flaps were hydraulically powered.

The small Turbomeca Marboré turbojet engine was mounted in the central lower fuselage, fed from wing root inlets and exhausting under the raised rear fuselage just aft of the wing trailing edge.  Fuel was supplied from one fuselage and two wing tanks. The horizontal tail was unswept and straight tapered, with squared tips, the starboard elevator carrying an electrically operated trim tab. The fin and rudder were also straight tapered but swept, with a long, low dorsal strake. The cockpit, positioned forward of the wing, seated two side by side.  It had a one piece windscreen and a single piece, rear hinged canopy.  The Cobra had a retractable tricycle undercarriage, the wing mounted main members swinging inwards close to the air inlet ducts.

The Cobra first flew on 16 November 1960. The construction of a second prototype, the four seat Cobra 480, was begun but not finished.

Operational history

The sole flying Cobra was lost in an accident in August 1965. The unfinished Cobra 480 still exists and building continues in 2010.

Variants
Cobra 400 First prototype, two seater.
Cobra 480 Second prototype, four seater ,only partly built.

Specifications (Cobra 400)

References

External links
NACA 643218 airfoil

1960s Italian sport aircraft
Single-engined jet aircraft
Low-wing aircraft
Aircraft first flown in 1960